Philip Myers may refer to:
 Philip Myers (musician), American French horn player
 Sir Philip Myers (police officer), British police officer
 Philip van Ness Myers, American historian

See also
 Phillip Myers, politician and auctioneer in New South Wales, Australia
 Philippe Myers, Canadian ice hockey player